The torsion constant is a geometrical property of a bar's cross-section which is involved in the relationship between angle of twist and applied torque along the axis of the bar, for a homogeneous linear-elastic bar. The torsion constant, together with material properties and length, describes a bar's torsional stiffness. The SI unit for torsion constant is m4.

History 
In 1820, the French engineer A. Duleau derived analytically that the torsion constant of a beam is identical to the second moment of area normal to the section Jzz, which has an exact analytic equation, by assuming that a plane section before twisting remains planar after twisting, and a diameter remains a straight line.
Unfortunately, that assumption is correct only in beams with circular cross-sections, and is incorrect for any other shape where warping takes place.

For non-circular cross-sections, there are no exact analytical equations for finding the torsion constant. However, approximate solutions have been found for many shapes.
Non-circular cross-sections always have warping deformations that require numerical methods to allow for the exact calculation of the torsion constant.

The torsional stiffness of beams with non-circular cross sections is significantly increased if the warping of the end sections is restrained by, for example, stiff end blocks.

Partial Derivation 
For a beam of uniform cross-section along its length:

where
 is the angle of twist in radians
T is the applied torque
L is the beam length
G is the Modulus of rigidity (shear modulus) of the material
J is the torsional constant

Torsional Rigidity (GJ) and Stiffness (GJ/L)  
Inverting the previous relation, we can define two quantities: the torsional rigidity,

 with SI units N⋅m2/rad

And the torsional stiffness,

 with SI units N⋅m/rad

Examples for specific uniform cross-sectional shapes

Circle

where
r is the radius
This is identical to the second moment of area Jzz and is exact.

alternatively write: 
where
D is the Diameter

Ellipse

where
a is the major radius 
b is the minor radius

Square

where
a is half the side length.

Rectangle

where
a is the length of the long side
b is the length of the short side

 is found from the following table:

Alternatively the following equation can be used with an error of not greater than 4%:

Thin walled open tube of uniform thickness

t is the wall thickness
U is the length of the median boundary (perimeter of median cross section

Circular thin walled open tube of uniform thickness
This is a tube with a slit cut longitudinally through its wall. Using the formula above:

t is the wall thickness
r is the mean radius

References

External links
 Torsion constant calculator

Continuum mechanics
Structural analysis